Johannes Otto Kehr (27 April 1862 – 20 May 1916) was a German surgeon and professor of surgery born in Waltershausen, Saxe-Coburg and Gotha.

He practiced surgery at a private clinic in Halberstädt, and from 1910 worked in Berlin. He is known for the development of operative procedures for the treatment of gall bladder and bile duct diseases. 

In the late 19th century, Kehr popularized the cholecystectomy for the treatment of gallstones. He is credited with performing 2600 operations of the biliary tract during his career.

Eponyms 
His name is lent to Kehr's sign, which is in an indication of acute pain in the left shoulder associated with a ruptured spleen. Also, he popularized a device for biliary drainage that today is known as "Kehr's T-tube".

Selected publications 
 Die chirurgische Behandlung der Gallensteinkrankheit, 1896 
 Die in meiner Klinik geübte Technik der Gallensteinoperationen, 1905 
 Die Praxis der Gallenwege-Chirurgie in Wort und Bild, 2 volumes- 1913: (life works of Kehr) 
 Chirurgie der Gallenwege, 1913

References
 Parts of this article are based on a translation of the equivalent article from the German Wikipedia.
 Journal of Surgery Coledocolitiasis: Evolution of the diagnosis and treatment

1862 births
1916 deaths
People from Waltershausen
People from Saxe-Coburg and Gotha
German surgeons